The 2016 Boca Raton Bowl was a post-season American college football bowl game played on December 20, 2016 at FAU Stadium in Boca Raton, Florida. The third annual edition of the Boca Raton Bowl was one of the 2016–17 bowl games concluding the 2016 FBS football season.

Team selection
The game typically features conference tie-ins from the American Athletic Conference and the Mid-American Conference.  However, the 2016 participants were the University of Memphis Tigers of the AAC and the Western Kentucky Hilltoppers, who won the championship of Conference USA.

This was the sixth meeting between the schools, with the all-time series tied 2–2–1.  The most recent meeting was on October 27, 1956, where the Tigers (then known as the Memphis State Tigers) defeated the Hilltoppers by a score of 42–0.

Memphis Tigers

The Tigers finished the regular season with a record of 8–4. They formally accepted the bowl invitation to play in the Boca Raton Bowl on December 4, 2016.

Western Kentucky Hilltoppers

Following a 10–3 regular season, the Hilltoppers accepted the invitation to play at the Boca Raton Bowl. On December 5, Hilltoppers head coach Jeff Brohm left to fill the head coaching vacancy at Purdue University, with defensive coordinator Nick Holt named as interim head coach for the bowl game.

Game summary

The game started with both high-powered offenses stalling and going three-and-out. Memphis scored on their second drive, and the Hilltoppers responded with a touchdown of their own. Memphis's third drive ended with a field goal, while WKU pulled a trick play on first and goal – QB Mike White lateraled the ball to offensive lineman Forrest Lamp, who caught the ball and ran nine yards for the touchdown, giving Western Kentucky a four point lead. With 1:10 left in the first quarter, Western Kentucky defender Joel Iyiegbuniwe was ejected on a targeting call when he hit Memphis's Tony Pollard with his facemask while Pollard was attempting to catch the ball. The first quarter ended 14–10, WKU. The Tigers' fourth drive ended 48 seconds into the second quarter when kicker Jake Elliott hit the left upright on a 45-yard field goal, keeping the score 14–10. The Hilltoppers extended their lead to 11 with just under twelve minutes left in the 2nd as they capped their fourth drive with a 37-yard touchdown pass. Memphis responded just two minutes later with a touchdown pass of their own, cutting the lead back down to four. WKU then marched down the field, taking just under seven minutes, and scored on a 2-yard rush to culminate a 13 play drive, and took a 28–17 lead into halftime. The Hilltoppers got the ball to start the second half and, on the fourth play of the third quarter, scored on a 41-yard touchdown pass, extending their lead to 18. Memphis turned the ball over on downs on their ensuing drive, but WKU was unable to capitalize as kicker Skyler Simcox missed a 45-yard field goal, the second missed FG of the game. Memphis then got the ball back, but fumbled on the very next play to give the Hilltoppers possession on the Tigers' 21. Unlike the last, Western Kentucky capitalized on this turnover, and scored in three plays to extend their lead to 24 after the PAT was missed. With 6:18 left in the 3rd, WKU came close to losing another of their defenders (Juwan Gardner) to another targeting call, though this one was overturned. Memphis scored a touchdown on the next play, cutting the lead down to 17. Western Kentucky opened their next drive with a 38-yard pass on a flea flicker and a 32-yard rush, but then stalled on the 4-yard line and settled for a 21-yard field goal, extending the lead to 20. With 2:14 left in the 3rd, Memphis lost offensive lineman Trevon Tate after he received his second unsportsmanlike conduct penalty of the game. Clearly shaken, Tigers QB Riley Ferguson threw an interception on the next play, and WKU took over on the Memphis 30; Ferguson was injured on the play. WKU stalled on their ensuing drive, and the third quarter ended 44–24, Western Kentucky. Memphis's first drive of the fourth quarter resulted in a turnover on downs (their second of the game), and WKU took over on their own 29. Western Kentucky punted, and, on 4th & 12 of their next drive, Memphis threw a 45-yard touchdown pass to pull within 13. Western Kentucky added to their lead with just over two minutes to go in the game as Player of the Game Anthony Wales found the end zone from 1 yard out. There was no more scoring in the game, and Western Kentucky became the 2016 Boca Raton Bowl champions, 51–31.

Scoring summary

Source

Statistics

References

External links
 Box score at ESPN

Boca Raton Bowl
Boca Raton Bowl
Memphis Tigers football bowl games
Western Kentucky Hilltoppers football bowl games
Boca Raton Bowl
Boca Raton Bowl